The Zeitschrift für Angewandte Mathematik und Physik (English: Journal of Applied Mathematics and Physics) is a bimonthly peer-reviewed scientific journal published by Birkhäuser Verlag. The editor-in-chief is Kaspar Nipp (ETH Zurich). It was established in 1950 and covers the fields of theoretical and applied mechanics, applied mathematics, and related topics. According to the Journal Citation Reports, the journal has a 2017 impact factor of 1.711.

References

External links
 

Mathematics journals
Physics journals
Publications established in 1950
Springer Science+Business Media academic journals
Bimonthly journals
English-language journals